The Instituto Nacional de Colonización y Desarrollo Rural, was the administrative entity that was established by the Spanish State in October 1939, shortly after the end of the Spanish Civil War, in order to repopulate certain areas of Spain. This entity depended from the Ministry of Agriculture and it sought to alleviate the effects of the devastation caused by the three years of civil war.

The Instituto acquired land which it transferred to the villagers under different conditions according to the area and the levels of poverty of the tenants. The tenants eventually were expected to pay a small sum that allowed them to become the future owners of the land they tilled.

This ambitious plan led to the establishment of new villages in different parts of Spain, some of which still survive. The Instituto reached a height of activity and influence during the first two decades of Francoist Spain, but after the Plan de Estabilización in 1959, and the subsequent Planes de Desarrollo, its autarkic goals and ideals became outdated. By 1971 the word "Colonization" had stopped being politically correct and the name of the entity was changed to Instituto Nacional de Reforma y Desarrollo Agrario (IRYDA).

Goals and results
The Instituto's main goal was to increase agricultural production in Spain by devoting more land surface to agriculture. Priority was given to the development of new irrigated areas in arid and semi-arid zones. This goal was very effective for the propaganda purposes of the new regime and triumphalistic claims were made that the colonization measures would increase self-sufficiency. But often irrigation was opposed to the traditional and sustainable methods of dryland farming that were ecologically more in tune with locally available resources in fragile environments.

Although the plans of the IRYDA were implemented with the avowed goal of a "better management of natural resources of the country", the agricultural policies implemented were sometimes not mindful of the environment, leading to salinization of the terrain and to soil erosion in some areas. Some of the villages that were established in former wetlands or in chronic drought areas were later abandoned, along with the lands that surrounded them and that had formerly been earmarked for agriculture.

List of villages
Many of the new villages were given a name related to the nearest river or even a name with an explicit reference to the Caudillo in order to cast a benevolent image of Francisco Franco, like Llanos del Caudillo, Villafranco del Delta, a village in the Montsià comarca nowadays rechristened as El Poblenou del Delta or Isla Mayor near Seville, the former Villafranco del Guadalquivir.

Some of these new settlements were built to house the families whose houses were flooded when their ancestral village was submerged by the waters of one of the many reservoirs built during the development plans of the 1950s and 1960s, like Loriguilla, Mequinensa and Faió (Fayón), among others. Others were renovations and repopulations of previously extant but abandoned towns.

Andalucía
 Guadalimar del Caudillo, in Lupión, Province of Jaén 
 Guadalén del Caudillo, in Vilches, Province of Jaén
 Agrupación de Mogón, in Villacarrillo, Province of Jaén 
 Arroturas, in Villacarrillo, Province of Jaén 
 Agrupación de Santo Tomé (also known as Montiel) in Santo Tomé, Province of Jaén 
 Veracruz de Úbeda, in Úbeda, Province of Jaén 
 Solana de Torralba, in Úbeda, Province of Jaén 
 Valdecazorla, in Cazorla, Province of Jaén 
 San Miguel, in Úbeda, Province of Jaén 
 Donadio, in Úbeda, Province of Jaén 
 Puente del Obispo, in Baeza, Province of Jaén 
 Sotogordo, in Mancha Real, Province of Jaén 
 Vados de Torralba, in Villatorres, Province of Jaén 
 Campillo del Río, in Torreblascopedro, Province of Jaén 
 Miraelrío, in Vilches, Province of Jaén 
 Vegas de Santa María - Barrio de Linares, in Linares, Province of Jaén 
 Espeluy expansion, in Espeluy, Province of Jaén 
 La Quintería, in Villanueva de la Reina, Province of Jaén 
 Los Villares de Andújar, in Andújar, Province of Jaén 
 Vegas de Triana, in Andújar, Province of Jaén 
 Llanos del Sotillo, in Andújar, Province of Jaén 
 La Ropera, in Andújar, Province of Jaén 
 Poblado de San Julián, in Marmolejo, Province of Jaén 
 Bembézar del Caudillo, in Hornachuelos, Province of Córdoba 
 Villafranco del Guadalhorce, in Alhaurín el Grande, Province of Málaga
 Guadalcacín (formerly Guadalcacín del Caudillo), in Jerez de la Frontera, Province of Cádiz 
 Isla Mayor (formerly Villafranco del Guadalquivir), in the Province of Sevilla 
 El Viar (formerly El Viar del Caudillo), in Alcalá del Río, Province of Sevilla  
 Peñuelas, in Láchar, Province of Granada
 Fuensanta, in Pinos Puente, Province of Granada 
 Loreto, in Moraleda de Safayona, Province of Granada 
 Romilla la Nueva, in Chauchina, Province of Granada
 El Chaparral, in Albolote, Province of Granada 
 Buenavista (known as Burrianca), in Alhama de Granada, Province of Granada 
 San Isidro, in Níjar, Province of Almeria
 Campohermoso, in Níjar, Province of Almeria
 Atochares, in Níjar, Province of Almeria
 Puebloblanco, in Níjar, Province of Almeria
Aragón
 Camporreal, in Sos del Rey Católico, Province of Zaragoza
 Alera, in Sádaba, Province of Zaragoza
 Bárdena del Caudillo, in Ejea de los Caballeros, Province of Zaragoza
 Valareña, in Ejea de los Caballeros, Province of Zaragoza
 El Bayo, in Ejea de los Caballeros, Province of Zaragoza
 Santa Anastasia, in Ejea de los Caballeros, Province of Zaragoza
 Pinsoro, in Ejea de los Caballeros, Province of Zaragoza
 Valareña, in Ejea de los Caballeros, Province of Zaragoza
 El Sabinar, in Ejea de los Caballeros, Province of Zaragoza
 Ontinar de Salz, in Zuera, Province of Zaragoza
 Puilatos, in Zuera, Province of Zaragoza, (demolished)
 Sancho Abarca, in Tauste, Province of Zaragoza
 Santa Engracia, in Tauste, Province of Zaragoza
 Valsalada in Almudévar, Huesca
 Artasona del Llano in Almudévar, Province of Huesca
 San Jorge in Almudévar, Province of Huesca
 El Temple, in Gurrea de Gállego, Province of Huesca
 Sodeto, in Alberuela de Tubo, Province of Huesca
 Valmuel (formerly Alpeñés del Caudillo), in Alcañiz, Province of Teruel
 Puigmoreno (formerly Campillo de Franco), in Alcañiz, Province of Teruel
Castilla La Mancha
 Alberche del Caudillo, in Calera y Chozas, Province of Toledo
Talavera la Nueva, in Talavera de la Reina, Province of Toledo
 Llanos del Caudillo, in the Province of Ciudad Real 
 Cinco Casas, in the Province of Ciudad Real
 Consolación (formerly Villanueva de Franco), in Valdepeñas, Province of Ciudad Real
 Pueblo Nuevo del Bullaque, Province of Ciudad Real
Santa Quiteria, Province of Ciudad Real
 Bazán, Province of Ciudad Real
Los Mirones, in Valenzuela de Calatrava, Province of Ciudad Real
 Cañada de Agra, Province of Albacete
Mingogil, Province of Albacete
Nava de Campana, in Hellín, Province of Albacete
 Aguas Nuevas, Province of Albacete
Castilla-León
 Águeda del Caudillo, in Ciudad Rodrigo, Province of Salamanca  
 Cascón de la Nava, Province of Palencia 
 Foncastín, in Rueda, Province of Valladolid
 San Bernardo, Province of Valladolid
 Guma, Province of Burgos
Catalonia
Poblenou del Delta (formerly Villafranco del Delta), in Amposta, Province of Tarragona 
 Gimenells, now Gimenells i el Pla de la Font, Province of Lleida
 El Pla de la Font, now Gimenells i el Pla de la Font, Province of Lleida
 Sucs, Province of Lleida, was an abandoned town, renovated and repopulated under the Franco plan
Extremadura
 Docenario, in La Serena, Province of Badajoz
 Gévora (formerly Gévora del Caudillo), in the Province of Badajoz
 Guadiana del Caudillo in the Province of Badajoz
 Novelda del Guadiana, in Badajoz, Province of Badajoz
 Pueblonuevo del Guadiana, in the Province of Badajoz
 Villafranco del Guadiana, in Badajoz, Province of Badajoz
 Alagón del Río (formerly Alagón del Caudillo), in Galisteo, Province of Cáceres 
 El Batán, in the Province of Cáceres
 Puebla de Argeme, in the Province of Cáceres
 Rincón del Obispo, in the Province of Cáceres
 San Gil, in the Province of Cáceres
 Tiétar (formerly Tiétar del Caudillo), Province of Cáceres 
 Vegaviana, in the Province of Cáceres
Valencian Community
San Isidro
Benaixeve
El Realengo, Crevillent (Province of Alicante)
San Antonio de Benagéber (Sant Antoni de Benaixeve)
Sant Isidre de Benaixeve
Tous
Cortitxelles
Navarre
 Figarol
 Rada
 Gabarderal
 El Boyeral (abandoned)
 San Isidro del Pinar

See also
ICONA
Francoist Spain
Sustainable agriculture

References
 
 Proyecto "Regadíos" en ADICOMT
 El Instituto Nacional de Colonización y su actuación en Cinco Villas
 Instituto Nacional de Colonización in the Provincia de Jaén

External links 
Los 'conquistadores' de Guadalcacín
 History and evolution of agrarian colonization in Spain (1939/1982)
 Resolució de l'Institut Nacional de Colonització pel qual s'adjudiquen les obres de "Construcció del nou poble en la finca "Masia de Cortitxelles" (Torís, València)".

Rural community development
Francoist Spain
Government of Spain